Kurt Rosenkranz (born 2 August 1927) is an Austrian adult educator. He was born in Vienna.

Life 
Kurt Rosenkranz grew up in the Viennese district of Brigittenau. His Jewish parents and grandparents had emigrated from Eastern Europe to Vienna. At the age of 9 he became a member of the boys' choir at the temple (de) in Kaschlgasse.

In the year 1938, in the course of the “Anschluss” Kurt Rosenkranz experienced riots and humiliation. He was transferred from his old school to a “Sammelschule” for Jews in Währingerstraße 43. The Rosenkranz family fled to Riga, but when the German troops arrived there, the members of the Rosenkranz family were transferred to Soviet camps and interned first at Novosibirsk in Russia, then in Karaganda in Kazakhstan.

In 1946 Kurt Rosenkranz returned to Vienna to work with his father in their small shoe factory.

In 1989 Kurt Rosenkranz founded the Jewish Institute for Adult Education.

He earned the title “Professor” for his merits. His brother Herbert Rosenkranz worked as a historian at Yad Vashem.

Writings 
 Together with David Zelinger (ed.): Verpflichtung eines Überlebenden – Reden und Berichte. Bohmann, Vienna 1993

Literature 
 "Encyclopaedia of Austrian Authors of Jewish Descent. 18th to 20th Century"; Ed.: Austrian National Library, Vienna. K.G. Saur, Munich 2002,  (Volume 2)
 Christian H. Stifter, Brigitte Ungar-Klein (ed.): Bildung gegen Vorurteile, Festschrift aus Anlass des 10jährigen Jubiläums des Jüdischen Instituts für Erwachsenenbildung, Wien 2000

References

External links 
 Jewish Institute for Adult Education 

Austrian educators
People condemned by Nazi courts
Austrian Jews
Businesspeople from Vienna
People from Brigittenau
1927 births
Possibly living people